The 1988–89 Washington State Cougars men's basketball team represented Washington State University for the 1988–89 NCAA Division I men's basketball season. Led by second-year head coach Kelvin Sampson, the Cougars were members of the Pacific-10 Conference and played their home games on campus at Beasley Coliseum in Pullman, Washington.

At the conference tournament, the Cougars defeated ninth seed Oregon by 22 points in the first round. In the quarterfinal against top-ranked Arizona, the Cougars fell by eight points.

Postseason results

|-
!colspan=5 style=| Pacific-10 Tournament

References

External links
Sports Reference – Washington State Cougars: 1988–89 basketball season

Washington State Cougars men's basketball seasons
Washington State Cougars
Washington State
Washington State